The crossed hands gesture is a hand signal that denotes  Albania in International Sign. Known as shenja e flamurit (flag sign) in Albanian, it is sometimes referred to as the "eagle gesture" and is a symbol used by ethnic Albanians in Albania, Kosovo, North Macedonia, and other regions of the world where Albanians live. It is meant to visually demonstrate the double-headed eagle, the main image on the Albanian flag. The symbolism of the double-headed eagle among Albanians encapsulates their ethnicity and flag, viewing it as a symbol that represents ethnic-Albanian people across the globe.

This gesture is often performed by players of the Albania national football team to celebrate a goal or at the end of a victorious game. It has also been used by some ethnic Albanians playing for other teams.

The gesture which resembles the double-headed eagle on the Albanian flag, is also associated with Albanian ethnicity where Albanians call themselves as "Shqiptar" (son of eagle) and their country "Shqipëri" (land of eagles).

In the 2018 FIFA World Cup, Kosovo-born Swiss players Xherdan Shaqiri and Granit Xhaka, both ethnic Albanians, performed the gesture in a match against Serbia and were subsequently fined by FIFA "for unsporting behaviour contrary to the principles of fair-play".

References

Hand gestures
Albanian culture
Albanian traditions